3917 Franz Schubert, provisional designation , is a bright background asteroid from the inner regions of the asteroid belt, approximately 5 kilometers in diameter. It was discovered on 15 February 1961, by astronomer Freimut Börngen at the Karl Schwarzschild Observatory in Tautenburg, Germany. The asteroid was named after Austrian composer Franz Schubert.

Orbit and classification 

Franz Schubert is a non-family asteroid from the main belt's background population. It orbits the Sun in the inner main-belt at a distance of 2.3–2.4 AU once every 3 years and 7 months (1,323 days; semi-major axis of 2.36 AU). Its orbit has an eccentricity of 0.02 and an inclination of 2° with respect to the ecliptic.

The body's observation arc begins with its official discovery observation at Tautenburg in February 1961.

Physical characteristics

Diameter and albedo 

According to the survey carried out by the NEOWISE mission of NASA's Wide-field Infrared Survey Explorer, Franz Schubert measures 5.129 kilometers in diameter  and its surface has a high albedo of 0.321.

Rotation period 

As of 2017, no rotational lightcurve of Franz Schubert has been from photometric observations. The asteroid's rotation period, shape and poles remain unknown.

Naming 

This minor planet was named after Austrian composer Franz Schubert (1797–1828). The official naming citation was published by the Minor Planet Center on 20 February 1989.

References

External links 
 "Die Entdeckung des kleinen Planeten (3917) Franz Schubert", ADS Astronomy Abstract Service 
 (3917) Franz Schubert at AstDys-2
 Asteroid Lightcurve Database (LCDB), query form (info )
 Dictionary of Minor Planet Names, Google books
 Asteroids and comets rotation curves, CdR – Observatoire de Genève, Raoul Behrend
 Discovery Circumstances: Numbered Minor Planets (1)-(5000) – Minor Planet Center
 
 

003917
Discoveries by Freimut Börngen
Named minor planets
19610215